Events from the year 1637 in England.

Incumbents
 Monarch – Charles I
 Secretary of State – Sir John Coke

Events
 18 February – Eighty Years' War: Battle off Lizard Point: off the coast of Cornwall, a Spanish fleet intercepts an Anglo-Dutch merchant convoy of 44 vessels escorted by 6 warships, destroying or capturing 20 of them.
 30 April – King Charles issues a proclamation attempting to stem emigration to the North American colonies.
 27 June – English merchants led by captain John Weddell establish the first trading settlement at Canton.
 30 June – William Prynne is branded as a seditious libeller, and sentenced to pillorying and mutilation.
 13 October – First-rate ship of the line  is launched at Woolwich Dockyard at a cost of £65,586, adorned from stern to bow with gilded carvings.
 Member of Parliament John Hampden continues to refuse to pay ship money although a 7-5 majority verdict among a group of judges supports its legality.

Births
 March – Anne Hyde, first wife of King James II (died 1671)
 17 March – Princess Anne (died 1640)
 27 August – Charles Calvert, 3rd Baron Baltimore, Governor of Maryland (died 1715)
 6 December – Edmund Andros, colonial administrator (died 1714)

Deaths
 6 August – Ben Jonson, writer (born 1572)
 8 September – Robert Fludd, mystic (born 1574)
 4 December – Nicholas Ferrar, trader (born 1592)

References

 
Years of the 17th century in England